Selena Gomez & the Scene, an American band, has released three studio albums, one remix album, seven singles and seven music videos. The band released their debut album, Kiss & Tell on September 29, 2009. The album debuted at number nine on the US Billboard 200 and in March 2010 the album was certified gold by Recording Industry Association of America (RIAA). The second single from the album, "Naturally", reached the top thirty in the United States, the top twenty in New Zealand, Canada and Germany and the top ten in both Ireland and the United Kingdom. The song has also been certified platinum in the United States and Canada. Their second album, A Year Without Rain was released on September 21, 2010. It debuted on the US Billboard 200 at number four and was certified Gold by the RIAA in January 2011. Two singles were released from the album, "Round & Round" and "A Year Without Rain".

Their third album, When the Sun Goes Down was released on June 28, 2011. The first single from the album, "Who Says" was released on March 14, 2011. The second single from the album, "Love You like a Love Song" was released on June 17, 2011. The album peaked at number 3 on the US Billboard 200. It stayed for an entire month in the top ten. In its first week the album sold over 78,000 copies. It was certified Gold in the US by the RIAA on November 17, 2011. As of March 2015, the band sold over 5 million albums with combined sales from Kiss & Tell, A Year Without Rain and When the Sun Goes Down.

Albums

Studio albums

Compilation albums

Singles

Promotional singles

Other appearances

Music videos

See also
 Selena Gomez discography

Notes

References

Discographies of American artists
Pop music discographies